Luweero is a town in the Central Region of Uganda. It is the main municipal, administrative, and commercial center of Luweero District.

History
In 1982, in the Ugandan Civil War, Milton Obote's soldiers raided their village, from Kampala.

Location
The road is a busy, all-weather tarmac highway. The coordinates of the town are 0°49'59.0"N, 32°29'58.0"E (Latitude:0.833056; Longitude:32.499444).

Overview
Luweero is one of several municipalities in Luweero District.

Population
The population of the town of Luweero was estimated at 23,500 during the 2002 national census. In 2010, the Uganda Bureau of Statistics (UBOS) estimated the population at approximately 28,800. In 2011, UBOS estimated the mid-year population at 29,500. During the national population census of 2014, the population was enumerated at 42,734.

In 2015, UBOS estimated the population of Luweero Town at 43,700. In 2020, the population agency estimated the mid-year population of the town at 49,100. Of these, 26,100 (53.2 percent) were females and 23,000 (46.8 percent) were males. UBOS calculated that the population of Luweero Town increased at an average estimated rate of 2.4 percent per year, between 2015 and 2020.

Points of interest
In Luweero or near the town, there are several points of interest, including the following:

 Headquarters of Luweero District Administration
 Offices of Luweero Town Council
 Headquarters of the Roman Catholic Diocese of Kasana–Luweero
 Headquarters of the Seventh-day Adventist North Buganda station.(Seventh-day Adventist Church)
 Headquarters of the Anglican Luweero Diocese (Church of Uganda)
 Luweero Central Market
 Headquarters of Wekembe SACCO, a microfinance institution
 Kampala-Masindi highway, passing through the center of town in a north/south alignment
 Luweero-Kasana Health Centre IV, a public health facility.

See also

 Luwero Triangle
 List of cities and towns in Uganda

References

External links
 Profile of Luweero District
 Luweero Diocese (Church of Uganda)

Populated places in Central Region, Uganda
Cities in the Great Rift Valley
Luweero District